Keep Talking may refer to:

Songs
"Keep Talking" (Cyrus song)
"Keep Talking" (Pink Floyd song)
"Keep Talking", a song by Rita Ora from Phoenix

Other uses
Keep Talking (game show), a 1958–1960 American game show
Keep Talking (group), a conspiracy and Holocaust-denial group in the United Kingdom

See also
Keep Talking and Nobody Explodes, a 2015 video game